Tanin'iver (compd. of Heb. תַנִין, "dragon" + עִוֵר, "sightless" — the "blind dragon") is an evil cosmic entity expounded in the kabbalistic teachings of Moses Cordovero and subsequent writings based on his system. He is the steed of Lilith, so he is considered a mechanism by which evil is activated. Though Tanin'iver is castrated (echoing a fable about the Yetzer ha-Ra), he is still the catalyst for the coupling of Lilith with Samael, a union that brings pestilence into the world.

References

Demons in Judaism
Dragons